Karol Miarka known as the Younger or Son (June 11, 1856 – May 12, 1919) was a Polish printer and publisher, social activist in Upper Silesia, fighting to maintain Polishness.

Biography 
He was the son of Karol. He graduated from the gymnasium in Cieszyn. After his father, he took over a printing shop in Mikołów, which he turned into a professional printing company. He printed books (including books written by Mickiewicz, Slowacki, Krasiński), calendars and songbooks in mass quantities and then distributed them to the residents of villages and small towns. He received a gold medal for his publications shown at the 1894 . Miarka's Mikołów printing house also published calendars. Very popular in Silesia was the Kalendarz Mariański which in 1898 reached a gigantic circulation of 100,000 copies for the time. In 1910, he sold the publishing house to 's press concern. From 1912 he ran a Literary and Publishing Office in Racibórz.

On June 10, 1920, the publishing house of Karol Miarka also printed the first issue of the satirical magazine Kocynder.

See also 

 Karol Miarka – his father

References

Bibliography 

 Mieczysław Pater, Karol Miarka – drukarz, Polski Słownik Biograficzny, tom XX, wyd. 1975

1856 births
1919 deaths
Polish printers
Polish activists
People from Pszczyna County